Cobre mine (copper mine) may refer to:

 Cobre mine, Cuba, a defunct copper mine in Cuba
 Cobre mine, Panama, a recently opened copper mine in Panama